Plexippus paykulli is a species of jumping spider. It is native to south east Asia but has spread to other parts of the world and globe. In the United States it is called the pantropical jumping spider. It is usually associated with buildings and may be found near light sources catching insects attracted by the light. It is named in honor of Gustaf von Paykull.

Distribution

Plexippus paykulli is cosmopolitan in distribution. It is native to tropical regions of Africa and Asia. The species has been introduced to the Americas, where it can be found from the southern United States to Paraguay. It is also present in Australia.

They are also found in the islands of Maldives.

Description

Plexippus paykulli is robust, with a high carapace. It is covered with short greyish hairs with sometimes dramatic accents of red in the male. The sexes are easy to tell apart as the males have a black carapace and abdomen with a broad white central stripe, another broad white stripe on either side and a pair of white spots near the posterior end of the abdomen. The stripe continues to the anterior eyes so the face appears to have three white stripes on a black background. The female is brownish grey, the carapace being darker especially around the eyes, with a broad tan stripe that extends onto the abdomen where it breaks into two chevrons. There are two white spots on either side of the posterior end of the abdomen. Immature spiders resemble the females.

Biology
Plexippus paykulli is generally found living on and around man-made structures, in particular on buildings, although it has also been recorded from citrus groves and cotton fields. In this a lens-shaped silken case is made into which 35 to 60 eggs are deposited. The female guards these until the spiderlings emerge and disperse some three to four weeks later.

This spider does not spin a web but builds a silken retreat in an elevated position such as the edge of the ceiling from which it makes hunting forays. It has very acute eyesight and approaches its target prey stealthily, leaping on it when close enough. Prey species that have been recorded as being part of the diet include Diptera, Hemiptera, Hymenoptera, Lepidoptera, Odonata, Orthoptera and Aranea. In one study, these spiders hunted and consumed individuals of sixteen species of arthropods from fourteen families and six orders. They are reported as being a predator of mosquitoes in African houses, and of insect pests such as the cotton jassid in India and Bangladesh. They are highly agile and can cover many times their own body length in a single jump. In a building where the only available prey were German cockroaches, Blattella germanica, the spiders not only survived but also bred on this monophagous diet.<ref name=Peck>[http://peckhamia.com/peckhamia/PECKHAMIA%2065.1.pdf Facultative Monophagy in the Jumping Spider ..Plexippus paykulli]</ref> They are able to successfully kill prey twice their own size. Large arthropods are injected with venom but are usually overpowered by brute strength before the venom has immobilized them. There have been records of the prey flying, jumping or running away with the spider clinging to it until the victim was eventually overpowered. A study investigated the way in which these spiders stalked their prey. It was found that a mobile prey like a fly was stalked in a different manner to an immobile one such as a maggot. On a camouflaged background, the spider approached with greater stealth and jumped from a shorter distance to attack a mobile prey. This gave the spider a greater likelihood of a successful outcome without prior detection.

It was concluded based on a study that the protein fractions of Plexippus paykulli'' venom had bio-insecticide potential.

References

External links

Plexippus paykulli at Worldwide database of jumping spiders
Plexippus paykulli at Global Species Database of Salticidae (Araneae)
Plexippus paykulli at Salticidae: Diagnostic Drawings Library
Plexippus paykulli at Bugguide.net

Salticidae
Cosmopolitan spiders
Spiders described in 1826